"Fallin' Never Felt So Good" is the debut single by American country music artist Shawn Camp. It was released in July 1993 as the first single from his eponymous debut album. The song was written by Camp and Will Smith. It reached No. 39 on the Billboard Hot Country Singles & Tracks chart. Before Camp's release, Dude Mowrey recorded the song on his 1991 debut album Honky Tonk.

Mark Chesnutt also released a version of the song from his 2000 album Lost in the Feeling, for MCA Nashville Records. Chesnutt's version was also a single, reaching No. 52 on the same chart that year. Like Camp's version, Chesnutt's was produced by Mark Wright.

Chart performance

References

1993 debut singles
1991 songs
Shawn Camp (musician) songs
Songs written by Shawn Camp (musician)
Song recordings produced by Mark Wright (record producer)
Reprise Records singles
MCA Nashville Records singles
2000 singles
Mark Chesnutt songs